Goveni or Gavani or Guni may refer to:
 Gavani, East Azerbaijan
 Goveni, Kermanshah
 Guni, West Azerbaijan
 Guni, Zanjan
 Guni, Vedensky District
 Guni (biblical figure)
 Guni Israeli (born 1984), Israeli basketball player